A university press is an academic publishing house affiliated with an institution of higher learning that specializing in the publication of monographs and scholarly journals. This article outlines notable presses of this type, arranged by country; where appropriate, the page also specifies the academic institution that each press is affiliated with and whether a press belongs to the Association of University Presses (AUP), the Association of European University Presses (AEUP), Association of Canadian University Presses (ACUP), or the Association Française des Presses d’Universités Diffusion (AFPU-D).

Argentina

Armenia

Australia

Austria

Bangladesh

Belgium

Brazil

Bulgaria

Canada

Chile

China

Colombia

Czech Republic

Denmark

Egypt

Estonia

Ethiopia

Finland

France

Germany

Greece

Hong Kong

Hungary

India

Indonesia

Iran

Ireland

Israel

Italy

Jamaica

Japan

Jordan

Kazakhstan

Kenya

Latvia

Lebanon

Lithuania

Malaysia

Mexico

Namibia

Netherlands

Nigeria

New Zealand

Norway

Panama

Peru

Philippines

Poland

Portugal

Qatar

Romania

Russia

Saudi Arabia

Senegal

Singapore

South Africa

South Korea

Spain

Sweden

Taiwan

Thailand

Tunis

Turkey

Ukraine

United Arab Emirates

United Kingdom

United States

Uzbekistan

Vietnam

Yemen

Zambia

See also

 Association of Learned and Professional Society Publishers (ALPSP) – an international association of 330 non-profit publishers
 Association of Jesuit University Presses (AJUP) – an association of 10 presses representing members of the Association of Jesuit Colleges and Universities
 International Convention of University Presses – an annual meeting of representatives from about 100 university presses

Notes

References

Higher education-related lists
Lists of book publishing companies